Bhangya Bhukya is an Indian historian who has made a significant contribution to the study of Banjara and Gond tribes of India. He is the author of several books including Subjugated Nomads: The Lambadas Under the Rule of the Nizams (2010) and Roots of the Periphery: A History of the Gonds of Deccan India (2017). He is Professor of History at the University of Hyderabad. He has served as associate professor at the English and Foreign Languages University, Hyderabad, and as assistant professor at Osmania University, Hyderabad. Dr Bhukya has specialized in modern Indian history and his work focuses on the history of subaltern and marginalized groups. He did his MA and MPhil from Hyderabad Central University, India, and his PhD from the University of Warwick, UK, on a Ford Foundation International Fellowship.

Bibliography
 History of Modern Telangana, Orient Blackswan (2017)
 The Roots of the Periphery. A History of the Gonds of Deccan India (2017) Oxford University Press
 Colonialism and Its Nomads in South India (2012)
 Subjugated Nomads: The Lambadas under the Rule of the Nizams (2010) Orient Blackswan
 The Lambadas: A Community Besieged (2002)

References

External links 
 Articles in EPW
 List of publications

Date of birth missing (living people)
Living people
Historians of South Asia
20th-century Indian non-fiction writers
21st-century Indian non-fiction writers
Historians of India
21st-century Indian historians
Year of birth missing (living people)